Zásada  is a market town in Jablonec nad Nisou District in the Liberec Region of the Czech Republic. It has about 900 inhabitants.

References

Market towns in the Czech Republic